Bertoglio is a surname. Notable people with the surname include:

Edo Bertoglio (born 1951), Swiss photographer and film director
Facundo Bertoglio (born 1990), Argentine footballer
Fausto Bertoglio (born 1949), Italian cyclist

See also
Bertoglio Glacier, glacier of Antarctica